Streblus ilicifolius is a species of flowering plant belonging to the family Moraceae.

Its native range is China (Southern Yunnan, Guangxi) to Tropical Asia.

References

ilicifolius